Dominik Topinka (born 31 July 1993) is a Czech track cyclist, who competes in sprinting events. He also competes in BMX racing.

References

External links
 
 
 
 

1993 births
Living people
Czech track cyclists
Czech male cyclists
BMX riders